Gafr and Parmon may refer to:
 Gafr and Parmon District
 Gafr and Parmon Rural District